Kenny is a neighborhood in the Southwest community in Minneapolis. Its boundaries are West 54th Street to the north, Lyndale Avenue South and Highway 121 to the east, West 62nd Street (Highway 62) to the south, and Logan Avenue South to the west.

Kenny contains one body of water, called Grass Lake. It has one elementary school called Kenny Elementary School, and has one middle school called Susan B. Anthony Middle School.

References

External links 
 Minneapolis Neighborhood Profile - Kenny
 Kenny Neighborhood Association

Neighborhoods in Minneapolis